Svetlana Aleksandrovna Bodritskaya (born 7 November 1971 in Shymkent, Ongutsik Qazaqstan) is a retired sprinter Kazakhstan, who specialized in the 400 metres. Her personal best time is 51.78 seconds, achieved in June 2004 in Almaty.

Competition record

External links
 
sports-reference

1971 births
Living people
People from Shymkent
Kazakhstani female sprinters
Athletes (track and field) at the 1996 Summer Olympics
Athletes (track and field) at the 2000 Summer Olympics
Athletes (track and field) at the 2004 Summer Olympics
Olympic athletes of Kazakhstan
Asian Games medalists in athletics (track and field)
Athletes (track and field) at the 1998 Asian Games
Athletes (track and field) at the 2002 Asian Games
Asian Games silver medalists for Kazakhstan
Asian Games bronze medalists for Kazakhstan
Medalists at the 1998 Asian Games
Medalists at the 2002 Asian Games
Olympic female sprinters
Kazakhstani people of Russian descent
20th-century Kazakhstani women
21st-century Kazakhstani women